The 5th Canadian Folk Music Awards were held on November 21, 2009, at the Dominion Chalmers Church in Ottawa, Ontario.

Nominees and recipients
Recipients are listed first and highlighted in boldface.

References

External links

05
Canadian Folk Music Awards
Canadian Folk Music Awards
Canadian Folk Music Awards
Canadian Folk Music Awards